The national garden festivals were part of the cultural regeneration of large areas of derelict land in Britain's industrial districts during the 1980s and early 1990s. Five were held in totalone every two years, each in a different town or cityafter the idea was pushed by the Conservative environment secretary Michael Heseltine in 1980. They were based on the German post-war Bundesgartenschau concept for reclaiming large areas of derelict land in cities, and cost from £25 million to £70 million each. They reclaimed the contaminated former sites of large industrial concerns such as steelworks.
 Liverpool Garden Festival, 1984. Now a mix of housing, derelict sites (some intended for house building as of 2013), and a section of parkland renovated to restore public access in the early 2010s.
 Stoke-on-Trent Garden Festival, 1986. Now mostly maturing garden parkland, with some retail and offices.
 Glasgow Garden Festival, 1988. Now the Glasgow Science Centre, and a digital media village on the banks of the River Clyde.
 Gateshead Garden Festival, 1990. Now a housing estate.
 Ebbw Vale Garden Festival, 1992. Now Festival Park Outlet shopping centre with attractions. A big area of parkland and a housing estate and business Park.

See also
 Urban regeneration
 Garden festival

Further reading

Andrew C. Theokas, Grounds for Review: The Garden Festival in Urban Planning and Design, Liverpool 2004.

1984 establishments in the United Kingdom
1992 disestablishments in the United Kingdom
Festivals established in 1984
Recurring events disestablished in 1992
Flower festivals in the United Kingdom
Garden festivals in the United Kingdom